Diāna Ņikitina (born 9 December 2000) is a Latvian former figure skater. She is the 2017 Golden Bear of Zagreb champion, the 2018 Cup of Tyrol silver medalist, and the 2018 Latvian national champion. She competed at the 2018 Winter Olympics in PyeongChang, placing 26th.

Earlier in her career, Ņikitina placed within the top ten at two World Junior Championships and won silver in the team event at the 2016 Winter Youth Olympics.

Early life 
Diāna Ņikitina was born on 9 December 2000 in Riga, Latvia. She studied through distance education at Riga Secondary School No. 1.

Career 
Ņikitina competed internationally on the novice level in the 2012–13 and 2013–14 seasons.

She moved up to the junior level in the 2014–15 season. Making her ISU Junior Grand Prix (JGP) debut, Ņikitina placed 11th in Japan in September 2014 and 5th in Croatia the following month. In March 2015, she competed at the World Junior Championships in Tallinn, Estonia, and qualified for the free skate by placing 13th in the short program. Her 10th place in the free lifted her to 10th overall.

During the 2015–16 JGP series, Ņikitina placed 12th in Latvia and 5th in Poland. She then collected three junior international medals – gold at the Volvo Open Cup, bronze at the Tallinn Trophy, and silver at the Toruń Cup. In February 2016, Ņikitina represented Latvia at the 2016 Winter Youth Olympics in Hamar, Norway; she placed 5th in the individual event and won silver in the team event. In March, she finished 10th at the 2016 World Junior Championships in Debrecen, Hungary.

Programs

Competitive highlights 
CS: Challenger Series; JGP: Junior Grand Prix

References

External links 
 

2000 births
Latvian female single skaters
Living people
Sportspeople from Riga
Latvian people of Russian descent
Figure skaters at the 2016 Winter Youth Olympics
Figure skaters at the 2018 Winter Olympics
Olympic figure skaters of Latvia